Karl Liebenberg (born 22 October 1947) is a former South African cricket umpire. He stood in nine Test matches between 1992 and 1995 and 33 ODI games between 1992 and 1996.

See also
 List of Test cricket umpires
 List of One Day International cricket umpires

References

1947 births
Living people
Sportspeople from Cape Town
South African Test cricket umpires
South African One Day International cricket umpires